Matthew Jeremy Walters (born August 22, 1979) is a former American football player.

While at Eau Gallie High School, Walters lettered in three sports, including golf and basketball. Scouted by Baylor University as well as the universities of Florida and Virginia, he chose the University of Miami. Majoring in mechanical engineering at "The U", Walters distinguished himself academically, being named a 2002 First-team Verizon Academic All-American as well as winning the 2002 Big East Football Scholar-Athlete Award.

Walters was drafted in the fifth round of the 2003 NFL Draft (selection 150 overall) by the New York Jets. Walters is currently pursuing a career as an amateur triathlete training under his coach, Ed Donner.

External links
NFL player profile
Pro Football Reference profile

1979 births
American football defensive ends
Living people
Miami Hurricanes football players
New York Jets players
People from Melbourne, Florida
Players of American football from Florida
Cologne Centurions (NFL Europe) players